Shezad Dawood (born 1974) is an artist born and based in London.

Shezad Dawood works across the disciplines of painting, film, neon, sculpture, performance, virtual reality and other digital media to ask key questions of narrative, history and embodiment. He uses collaboration and knowledge exchange, mapping across multiple audiences and communities. Through a fascination with the esoteric, otherness, the environment and architectures both material and virtual, Dawood interweaves stories, realities and symbolism to create richly layered artworks. These multi-media works are also inspired by his varied cultural heritage, having a Pakistani mother, an Indian father and an Irish stepmother.

He trained at Central Saint Martin's and received his MA from the Royal College of Art in 2000 before undertaking a PhD from the School of Arts at Leeds Metropolitan University (now Leeds Beckett University) in 2008 (Fine Art), titled 'The killing of Chief Crazy Horse: a metaphorical allegory in 3 parts'. Dawood is a Research Fellow in Experimental Media at the University of Westminster.

Selected exhibitions
Selected Solo Exhibitions and Commissions

2022:

 Coral Alchemy I & II, Commission for Desert X AlUla, SA

2021:

 Concert From Bangladesh, commission for British Council Digital Collaboration Fund
 Visions of Paradise, commission for The White House, Becontree, UK
 Between Land & Sea, Fogo Island Arts, Canada

2020:

 Encroachments, New Art Exchange, Nottingham, UK
 Leviathan: Dreams of a future past, The RYDER, Madrid, Spain
 Leviathan - The Paljassaare Chapter, Kai Art Center, Tallinn, Estonia
 Nets, Timothy Taylor, London, UK

2019:

 Leviathan, Kunstverein Munich, Germany
 Leviathan, Bluecoat, Liverpool, UK
 Leviathan, MOCA Toronto

2018:

 Leviathan, A Tale of a Tub, Rotterdam, The Netherlands
 Leviathan, The Atlantic Project and Plymouth Arts Centre, Plymouth, UK
 Leviathan: On Narrative and Philosophical Systems, HE.RO, Amsterdam, The Netherlands
 Leviathan: On Sunspots and Whales, Barakat Contemporary, Seoul
 A Lost Future: Shezad Dawood, Rubin Museum, USA
 Leviathan, MOSTYN, Wales, UK

2017:

 Leviathan, Fondazione Querini Stampalia, Venice

2016:

 Kalimpong, Timothy Taylor, London, UK
 Anarchitecture, Jane Lombard, New York, USA
 Why Depend on Space and Time, Galerist, Istanbul, Turkey

2015:

 The Room, Fig-2, ICA, London, UK
 Towards The Possible Film, John Hansard Gallery, Southampton, UK
 It was a time that was a time, Pioneer Works, New York City, USA

2014:

 Towards The Possible Film, Parasol Unit, London, UK
 Towards The Possible Film, Leeds Art Gallery, UK
 Anthropology of Chance, OCAT Xi’an, China
 Sadler’s Wells & Tate Visual Art Commission, 2014, Sadler’s Wells London, UK

2013:

 Wolf Panel, Paradise Row, London, UK
 Piercing Brightness, KINOKINO, Sandnes, Norway
 Trailer, Art in General, New York, USA

2012:

 Piercing Brightness, Newlyn Art Gallery & The Exchange, Penzance, Cornwall, UK
 Piercing Brightness, Modern Art Oxford, Oxford, UK

2011:

 New Dream Machine Project, L’Appartement22, Rabat, Morocco
 Piercing Brightness, Harris Museum & Art Gallery, Preston, UK

2010:

 A Mystery Play, Plug In ICA, Winnipeg, Canada
 The Jewels of Aptor, Paradise Row, London, UK
 Cities of the Future, Chemould Prescott Road, Mumbai, India
 Intensive Surfaces, Århus Kunstbygning, Århus, Denmark

Selected Group Exhibitions

2022:

 Leviathan, Toronto Biennial of Art

2021:

 In-Between Days, Guggenheim, USA
 Non-/Human Assemblages, Sea Art Festival, Busan, South Korea
 Hawala, Paradise Row, London, UK
 The Plot, Folkestone Triennial, UK

2020:

 Between the sun and the moon, Lahore Biennial, Pakistan
 University of NonDualism, Dhaka Art Summit, Bangladesh
 Risquons-Tout, Wiels, Belgium
 Infinite Village, Manifesta 13, Nice & Marseille, France
 Our Ashes Make Great Fertilizer, PUBLIC Gallery, London, UK
 The Light House, Boghossian Foundation – Villa Empain, Bruxelles, Belgium
 Winter Light, Southbank Centre, UK

2019:

 Leaving the Echo Chamber, Sharjah Biennial 14 – Sharjah Art Foundation
 Leviathan: The Cod Trap, Toronto Biennial of Art
 United Artists for Europe, Galerie Thaddeaus Ropac, London, UK
 The Aerodrome – An exhibition dedicated to the memory of Michael Stanley, IKON, Birmingham, UK
 5 Passages to the Future, National Gallery of Indonesia

2018:

 Imagined Borders, Gwangju Biennale, Gwangju, South Korea
 Delirium/Equilibrium, Kiran Nadar Museum of Art, New Delhi
 Delfina in SongEun: Power play, SongEun ArtSpace, Seoul
 What's essential, Jhaveri Contemporary, Mumbai
 Rendez-vous with Frans Hals, Frans Hals Museum, Haarlem, The Netherlands
 Lahore Biennale 01, Lahore, Pakistan

2017:

 Screen City Biennial, Stavanger, Norway
 I Want! I Want! - Art and Technology, Birmingham Museum & Art Gallery, UK
 HUMAN/DIGITAL: a symbiotic love affair Digital, Post Internet and Virtual Reality from the Brown Family Collection, Kunsthal Rotterdam, Netherlands

2016:

 Thinking Tantra, The Drawing Room, UK;
 Neon: The Charged Line, Grundy Art Gallery, UK
 Theatre De L'absurde, Galerie Gabriel Rolt, Amsterdam
 The Universe and Art, Mori Art Museum, Japan
 A Rotation of Six Video Works by Six International Artists from Collection (Anonymous), BMoCA's Union Works Gallery, USA
 Thinking Tantra, Jhaveri Contemporary, Mumbai, India

2015:

 Future Light, Vienna Biennale, Museum Angewandte Kunst (MAK) and Kunsthalle Wien, Vienna
 Doris Duke’s Shangri La: Architecture, Landscape, and Islamic Art, Honolulu Museum of Art, Honolulu
 Own Land/Foreign Territory, 7th Moscow Biennale, Manege, Moscow, Russia

2014:

 Blow up, Albertina Museum, Vienna, Austria
 Blow up, C/O Berlin, Germany
 Sous nos yeux, MACBA, Barcelona, Spain
 Where are we now? Marrakech Biennale 5, Morocco
 Moving Images, Art Dubai, UAE
 INTERACT: Deconstructing Spectatorship, Eastwing Biennial, Courtauld Institute, London, UK
 Thread, MMKA, Arnhem Museum, Netherlands
 The Great Acceleration, Taipei Biennial 2014, Taipei Fine Arts Museum, Taipei, Taiwan
 Blow-Up, Photo‐Museum Winterthur, Germany
 Conflict and Compassion - 3rd Asia Triennial Manchester, IWM North, Manchester, UK
 /Seconds, Sharjah Art Foundation, UAE

2013:

 Doris Duke’s Shangri La: Architecture, Landscape and Islamic Art, touring exhibition, Norton Museum of Art, West Palm Beach
 The World Turned Inside Out, Witte de With, Rotterdam, Netherlands
 Shakti, Kedleston Hall, Derby, UK
 I Appear Missing, Galerie Gabriel Rolt, Amsterdam, Netherlands
 Black Sun, Devi Art Foundation, Delhi (Curated by Shezad Dawood), India
 I Look to You and I See Nothing, Sharjah Art Foundation, Sharjah, UAE
 Sous nos yeux, La Kunsthalle Mulhouse, France
 Open Heart Surgery, The Moving Museum, London, UK

2012:

 Speak Nearby, Whitstable Biennale, UK
 Lost in Paradise: Du spiritual dans l'art actuel, Loft Sévigné, Paris, France
 Videonale 13 on tour, IZOLYATSIA Art Centre, Donetsk, Ukraine
 Drawings, Paradise Row, London, UK

2011:

 Videonale: Dialogue in Contemporary Video Art, National Taiwan Museum of Fine Arts, Taiwan
 Generation in Transition, Zacheta National Gallery of Art, Warsaw, Poland
 Videonale, Kunstmuseum Bonn, Bonn & BWA Contemporary Art Gallery, Katowice
 The Pavement and the Beach, Paradise Row, London, UK
 AS THE WORLD TURNS: New Art From London, Anna Schwartz Gallery, Sydney, Australia

2010:

 Living in Evolution, Busan Biennale, Busan
 Rude Britannia: British Comic Art, Tate Britain, London, UK
 Grand National, Vestfossen Kunstlaboratorium, Vestfossen
 Dawnbreakers, John Hansard Gallery, University of Southampton, Southampton, UK
 Wonderland, Assab One, Milano, Italy
 The Empire Strikes Back: Indian Art Today, Saatchi Gallery, London, UK

2009:

 AiM International Biennale 3rd Edition, Marrakech, Morocco
 Making Worlds, The 53rd Venice Biennale, Venice, Italy
 Natural Wonders: New Art from London, Baibakov Art Projects, Moscow, Russia
 Altermodern, Tate Triennial, Tate Britain, London, UK

2008:

 Indian Highway, in collaboration with Mukul Deora, Serpentine Gallery, London, UK
 Lightness of Being, Initial Access, The Frank Cohen Collection, UK
 ReAsia, HKW, Berlin, Germany

Selected publications
 Making New Time: Sharjah Biennial 14: Leaving the Echo Chamber, Omar Kholeif (ed.), Prestel, Munich, Germany, 2019. 
 Artists' Moving Image in Britain since 1989, Erika Balsam, Lucy Reynolds and Sarah Perks (eds.), Paul Mellon Centre for Studies in British Art; London, 2019. 
 Shezad Dawood: Kalimpong, Camilla Palestra (ed.), Sternberg Press and Timothy Taylor, London, 2016. 
 It was a time that was a time, Gabriel Florenz and David Everitt Howe (eds.). Pioneer Works, New York, 2015. 
 The Great Acceleration – Taipei Biennial 2014, Jo Hsiao (ed.), Taipei Fine Arts Museum, Taipei, Taiwan, 2014. 
 Shezad Dawood: Towards the Possible Film, Ziba Ardalan (ed.), Parasol unit foundation for contemporary art, London, 2014. 
 Black Sun, Gerrie van Noord (ed.). Ridinghouse in association with Devi Art Foundation and Arnolfini, 2013. 
 Piercing Brightness, Gerrie van Noord (ed.), Koenig Books, London, 2012.

Selected Press 
 ArtForum, March 2022, ‘Shezad Dawood, Jhaveri Contemporary’ by Mario D’Souza
 Third Text, ‘Piercing Brightness: by Shezad Dawood: Migration, Memory and Multiculturalism’ by Angus Deyn
 ArtReview, July 2021, 'Concert from Bangladesh'
 This is Tomorrow, February 2020, 'Shezad Dawood: Encroachments' by Julia Schouten
 Frontrunner April 2020, 'Shezad Dawood's Leviathan' by Olivia Burt
 Corridor8, October 2019, ‘Shezad Dawood's Leviathan' by Claire Walker
 COBO, August 2019, ‘In Shezad Dawood's (Virtual) Realities’ by Aaina Bhargava
 BOMB, 2018, 'Shezad Dawood's Kalimpong' by Sabine Russ
 Art Asia Pacific, 2018 ‘Kalimpong’ New York
 CCQ, 2018, 'Institution of the Leviathan' with Emily Hartless
 The Guardian, May 2017, ‘I’ve created a Monster! Shezad Dawood on his oceanic epic Leviathan’ by Hettie Judah
 Financial Times, September 2016, ‘The Gallery that wants you to run, jump and use your phone’ by Gareth Harris
 Frieze, October 2016, ‘Shezad Dawood at Timothy Taylor, London’ by Orit Gat

References 

English people of Indian descent
English people of Pakistani descent
Living people
Artists from London
1974 births
Alumni of the Royal College of Art
British contemporary artists
British artists of Pakistani descent